The IFWHA World Conference is the field hockey World Cup competition for women, whose format for qualification and the final tournament is similar to the men's. It has been held since 1930. The tournament has been organized by the Federation of Women's Hockey Associations (IFWHA).

Results

Summaries

Gallery

Successful national teams

* = host country
^ = includes results representing West Germany between 1974 and 1990
‡ = Ireland did not play against England, South Africa and Australia.

Team appearances

^ = includes results representing West Germany between 1974 and 1990

See also
Women's FIH Hockey World Cup

References

Hockey World Cup
field
Recurring sporting events established in 1933
Recurring sporting events disestablished in 1982
Quadrennial sporting events